NGC 7072 is a spiral galaxy located about 210 million light-years away in the constellation of Grus. NGC 7072 was discovered by astronomer John Herschel on September 5, 1834.

NGC 7072 is a member of the NGC 7060 group, a small group of galaxies.

See also 
 List of NGC objects (7001–7840)

References

External links 

Intermediate spiral galaxies
Grus (constellation)
7072
66874
Astronomical objects discovered in 1834